Danny Kennedy (born February 24, 1971) is a clean-technology entrepreneur, an environmental activist, and the author of the book Rooftop Revolution: How Solar Power Can Save Our Economy—and Our Planet—from Dirty Energy (2012). Kennedy serves as managing director of the California Clean Energy Fund, a non-profit dedicated to optimising the clean energy transition. He co-founded Sungevity, a rapidly growing residential solar power company, and Powerhouse, the primer solar incubator in Oakland. While at Sungevity, Kennedy won a Planet Forward Innovator of the Year award from the PBS program Planet Forward.

Early life 
Kennedy was born in Los Angeles to Australian parents. Kennedy and his family moved between the United States, Europe, and Australia until he was 11 years old, when his family settled in Sydney, Australia. Kennedy attended St. Aloysius School.

As a youngster Kennedy was a community organizer, fundraiser, journalist, and youth activist. At the age of 12 he was involved with a successful campaign to prevent construction of a dam in Tasmania. From 1983 he worked with the Australian Conservation Foundation on various projects including forestry protection and ozone depletion. In 1990 Kennedy was a representative at the Montreal Protocol Negotiations in London, where he met Alec Guettel (with whom he would later found Sungevity). In 1992 Kennedy organized around the first Rio Earth Summit and worked for the UN Conference on Environment and Development.

Career 

Kennedy began working with Greenpeace in the early 1990s, as a researcher seeking to end new oil exploration in Papua New Guinea. He almost died of malaria in the process. He left Greenpeace in 1995.

In 1996 Kennedy founded and directed Project Underground, an organization focused on human rights and committed to protecting people threatened by mining and oil operations.

Kennedy became the Director of the USA Clean Energy Now Campaign in 2000, and forged the California Clean Energy Now Campaign in 2001 and 2002; this campaign helped create the state’s California Solar Initiative, which provides substantial market support that has helped many citizens go solar. He moved back to Australia in 2003 and was the Campaigns Manager for Greenpeace Australia Pacific from 2003 to 2006.

Kennedy is an acquaintance of actress, Cate Blanchett, helping her in a project to green the building of the Sydney Theatre Company. In 2022, Kennedy and Blanchett launched the Climate of Change podcast on Audible to discuss climate change and the importance of preserving the environment.

In December 2006, Kennedy left Australia and moved to Oakland, California, where he currently lives with his wife and his youngest daughter, Ena Kennedy Yoshitani, to start Sungevity Inc., a residential solar power company, with colleagues Andrew Birch (CEO) and Alec Guettel (Chairman of the Board). The company designs home solar systems; finances new systems with its Solar Lease program; and manages system installation, maintenance, and performance. Kennedy founded Sungevity to promote the use of clean energy and eliminate the world’s dependence on fossil fuel.

In 2010 Kennedy offered to install solar panels on the roof of the White House. He also installed 48 solar panels on the roof of the residence of the president of The Maldives.

In 2015, Kennedy became managing director of the California Clean Energy Fund, a non-profit dedicated to optimizing the clean energy transition by connecting money to investments, ideas to support and issues to solutions. Its family of initiatives seeks to bring about the energy transition that is already underway, but sooner and better. The initiatives include CalCharge, a consortium of energy storage experts working together to develop breakthrough technologies (Kennedy serves as President); New Energy Nexus, an international network of clean energy accelerators and incubators providing the support global startups need to succeed, and; CalSEED, a seed-stage grant making fund providing early-stage financial support to promising energy concepts.

Kennedy is dedicated to helping solar technologies spread. He co-founded Powerhouse, the only incubator and accelerator solely focused on supporting solar entrepreneurs to succeed. Additionally, Kennedy serves on the board of The Solar Foundation, a global research and education organization in Washington, DC, VoteSolar, and several solar start-ups including Powerhive, a solar utility in Kenya, and Sunergise, a Fijian company taking solar as a service across the South Pacific, and was a founding board director of Mosaic, a solar-focused, crowd-funding start-up in Oakland, California. Danny writes a monthly column about renewable energy innovation, trends and opportunities called Shine On for Climate & Capital Media.

Profiles 
Clean disruption? Stanford group plans for 100% green-energy future, Canadian Broadcast Corporation. March 2, 2016
Solar power's rebel capitalist, E&E Reporting. February 4, 2016
California sun: Australian entrepreneur Danny Kennedy cashes in on US solar boom, Australian Broadcast Corporation. November 29, 2015
The Secret to Solar Power, New York Times Magazine. August 9, 2012

References

External links 
 Sungevity Blog
The Climate Debt the U.S. Owes the World
New Energy Nexus

Living people
1971 births
American environmentalists